The 2005 Dubai Sevens was an international rugby sevens tournament that took place at the Dubai Exiles Rugby Ground between 1 and 2 December 2005. It was the 18th edition of the Dubai Sevens (sixth as a World Series event) and was the first tournament of the 2005–06 World Sevens Series. Sixteen teams competed in the tournament and was separated into four groups of four with the top two teams from each group qualifying to the cup tournament.

After winning the group, South Africa took out the cup final defeating Fiji by a score of 28–26. New Zealand took out the plate while the bowl and shield was won by Wales and Kenya respectively.

Teams

Pool stages

Pool A
{| class="wikitable" style="text-align: center;"
|-
!width="200"|Team
!width="40"|Pld
!width="40"|W
!width="40"|D
!width="40"|L
!width="40"|PF
!width="40"|PA
!width="40"|+/-
!width="40"|Pts
|-
|align=left| 
|3||3||0||0||129||19||110||9 
|-
|align=left| 
|3||2||0||1||64||67||-3||7 
|-
|align=left| 
|3||1||0||2||55||48||7||5
|-
|align=left| 
|3||0||0||3||17||131||-114||3
|}

Pool B
{| class="wikitable" style="text-align: center;"
|-
!width="200"|Team
!width="40"|Pld
!width="40"|W
!width="40"|D
!width="40"|L
!width="40"|PF
!width="40"|PA
!width="40"|+/-
!width="40"|Pts
|-
|align=left| 
|3||3||0||0||66||26||40||9 
|-
|align=left| 
|3||2||0||1||80||33||47||7 
|-
|align=left| 
|3||1||0||2||64||75||-11||5
|-
|align=left| 
|3||0||0||3||17||74||-57||3
|}

Pool C

{| class="wikitable" style="text-align: center;"
|-
!width="200"|Team
!width="40"|Pld
!width="40"|W
!width="40"|D
!width="40"|L
!width="40"|PF
!width="40"|PA
!width="40"|+/-
!width="40"|Pts
|-
|align=left| 
|3||3||0||0||133||12||121||9 
|-
|align=left| 
|3||2||0||1||59||40||19||7 
|-
|align=left| 
|3||1||0||2||54||78||-24||5
|-
|align=left| 
|3||0||0||3||5||121||-116||3
|}

Pool D
{| class="wikitable" style="text-align: center;"
|-
!width="200"|Team
!width="40"|Pld
!width="40"|W
!width="40"|D
!width="40"|L
!width="40"|PF
!width="40"|PA
!width="40"|+/-
!width="40"|Pts
|-
|align=left| 
|3||3||0||0||80||21||59||9 
|-
|align=left| 
|3||2||0||1||40||43||-3||7 
|-
|align=left| 
|3||1||0||2||38||66||-28||5
|-
|align=left| 
|3||0||0||3||22||52||-30||3
|}

Finals

Shield

Bowl

Plate

Cup

References

External links
 Dubai Rugby 7s
 
  on irbsevens.com
 Dubai Sevens Profile on UR7s.com

2005
2005–06 IRB Sevens World Series
2005 in Emirati sport
2005 in Asian rugby union